Harry Bhandari (born October 1, 1977) is an American politician and a member of the Democratic Party. He is a member of the Maryland House of Delegates, representing the 8th district since 2019. In the Maryland General Assembly, he is a member of Health and Government Operations Committee, 2019- (health occupations & long-term care subcommittee, 2019-; insurance & pharmaceuticals subcommittee, 2019-). He is also the former Secretary and currently vice-chair of the Maryland Legislative Asian-American and Pacific-Islander Caucus, 2019- (member, 2019-; treasurer, 2019; chair, outreach committee, 2019-). He is also serving as Baltimore County State Central Committee member since 2018. Bhandari is also the former national secretary of the Minority Caucus of the Young Democrats of America. Upon taking office, in 2019 he made history by becoming the first Nepalese American state legislator in the U.S.

Biography

Dr. Bhandari is the first Nepali American state legislator in the U.S. An English teacher, school textbook author, principal, and lecturer, Bhandari attended Johns Hopkins University to continue his higher education and now an educator in Maryland as well as served as adjunct faculty at Baltimore City Community College. Harry also served as national secretary of Young Democrats of America (YDA) Minority Caucus and board of director in district six democratic and civic association club. He also volunteered as president of the Linover Community Association. He was appointed by Councilwoman Cathy Bevins to serve as a member of the Baltimore County Pedestrian and Bicycle Advisory Committee (PBAC) and is an advocate for more bike lanes across Baltimore. Harry is the recipient of the 2017 Baltimore County Asian American Award. In the 2016 presidential election, he founded an organization Nepali for Hillary and actively mobilized the volunteers in more than a dozen states in the U.S.  He studied Educational Leadership and Administration at Johns Hopkins University. He earned his Ph.D. in Language, Literacy, and Culture from R1 research University, University of Maryland, Baltimore County. He and his wife have two children and reside in Baltimore County.

Political career 
Delegate Bhandari was the chair of the Nepali for Hillary in 2016. In the 2020 presidential election, he volunteered as chair of Nepalese Americans for Biden (NAFB). It is a nationwide volunteer organization dedicated to mobilizing the Nepalese American community all across the nation to ensure Joe Biden's victory. As a grassroots organization, it has formed state chapters by networking with community leaders and advocates who share resources and ideas to help elect Democrats at national and local levels. Although Nepalese Americans are considered a minority community in the United States, the organization have a very strong presence in  Arizona, California, Colorado, Florida, Georgia, Kentucky, Illinois, Iowa, Maryland, Massachusetts, New Jersey, New York, North Carolina, Ohio, Pennsylvania, Texas, and Virginia. Fellow Democrats from AAPI and Nepalese American community for National grass-roots Virtual Rally, United for a common cause with Elected/Party Officers– the United States Senator Chris Van Hollen, Congresswoman Linda T. Sanchez AAPI Chair/DNC member Bel Leong-Hong, Robbie Leonard, MD Democratic Party Secretary/DNC member and many spoke at its virtual grassroots rally.

He is also on the Maryland Democratic State Central Committee member.  In the primary, he defeated Joe Werner the  Democratic nominee for the U.S. Congress in 2016, and secured 103,622 votes losing the race to the congressman Andy Harris. In the 2018 general election, Bhandari defeated the Republican incumbent and former Maryland Republican Party Director Joe Cluster in one of the most competitive elections in the state. His victory impressed many  and considered it as "American Dream" since Cluster has worked with the state Republican Party for more than 15 years, running its field operation  and as the party dire ctor he helped lead the party to historic victories in 2014, when business executive Larry Hogan became only the second Republican to win the governorship in nearly 50 years.

Legislative Accomplishment 2019-2021 
In 2019 Delegate Bhandari was covered in the national EDUCATION WEEK for his bill that became the law in the state of Maryland. The bill aims to help out deaf or hearing-impaired student and parents of deaf or hearing-impaired students. It would require the Hearing Aid Loan Bank program in the State Department of Education to lend certain videos and certain downloadable resource to the parents of hearing-impaired students, It would also exempt parents or guardians of deaf or hard of hearing children from paying tuition for certain courses at public institutions of higher education. This is a strong bill that looks to take care of some of those who need it most. Delegate Bhandari passed this bipartisan bill alongside Senator Chris West(Republican) 
In 2019, all three of his bond initiatives were fully funded, bringing much-needed funds to Parkville High School for a new turf field, Perry Hall High School for their stadium press box, and Linover Park for revitalization.

In 2020, legislative session three pieces of legislation he sponsored, as well as one he cross-filed from the Senate, made it into law.  HB543 - Estates and Trusts - makes it easier for a person to claim a check from an estate after the estate has already closed. HB 1229 - Disposition of Remains - clarifies how an individual can authorize and decide the disposition of the individual's own body. HB 1564 - Duties of Peace Officers and Emergency Facilities - requires a peace officer to notify a facility if an incoming patient before arriving and alters who may request an officer stay with an attendee, while also giving priority to such cases. And finally, SB692, Health Occupations - Physical Therapists and Physical Therapist Assistants - Qualifications which he cross-filed from the Senate, makes securing licensure easier for physical therapists and physical therapist assistants who received their education across state lines.

All of the four bond initiatives he sponsored were passed. Money from these initiatives will be going to Gunpowder Elementary for a playground; McCormick Elementary PAL Recreation Center; the installation of a turf field at Parkville High, and repairs for the Baltimore Association of Nepalese in America building.

In the 2021 Legislative session, five of his bills passed and three others pushed into larger pieces of legislation. He successfully passed sex offender legislation that would bar those on that list from attending in-person classes at comprehensive schools. This was the first bill he pre-filed, which he worked on tirelessly with Senator Kathy Klausmeier, Delegate Carl Jackson, and other delegates, as well as with Majority Leader Eric Luedtke, House Judiciary Committee Chair Luke Clippinger, and Senate Judicial Proceedings Chair Will Smith. This is a national first that protects students and teachers and keeps learning environments safe.

Another bill he passed boosts worker's compensation benefits for Baltimore County Correctional Officers, bringing them in line with their colleagues in the police and fire departments. Not only does this bring them in line with their local colleagues, it also does so with correctional officers in most surrounding jurisdictions. He worked with Baltimore County Federation of Public Employees President John Ripley and Denise Riley from the American Federation of Teachers - Maryland over the interim to make this a reality.
Two other pieces of legislation he worked on with the Maryland Department of Health passed through both chambers unanimously. The first grants temporary licenses to physical therapists and physical therapy assistants who have fulfilled their requirements while they wait on their exam date to come. This used to be law in Maryland but was repealed after the exam date was changed from a fixed date to a rolling date. Now it is back to a rolling date, making that a necessity yet again. The other bill he worked on with them would change the funding mechanism for the State Board of Environmental Health Specialists, moving their funding from a Special Fund to the General Fund. Finally, he was able to pass a local bill that will make it so that members of Baltimore County's Liquor Board will need to reside in the County.

Three of his bills were rolled into larger pieces of legislation. First and foremost, legislation that he worked on over the interim that would allow faculty and staff at CCBC to enter into collective bargaining was rolled into a statewide bill. He worked on this with CCBC faculty and adjuncts and multiple unions, as well as Dr. Sandra Kurtinitis. Likewise, aspects of his bipartisan police reform bill that he filed with Republican Senator Chris West found their way into other reform packages passed through the General Assembly, including the bipartisan Maryland Police Accountability Act, which received support from House Minority Leader Nick Kipke. Finally, his legislation to expand early voting by two days found a compromise in legislation that will increase polling sites and accessibility.

In the 2022 Legislative session, six out of seven bills he filed crossed over to the Senate. Four of his bills in the 2022 session passed in both the House of Delegates and the State Senate and are set to enact into law.  These include:
Bill 28, allows pharmacists to prescribe nicotine replacement therapies, making it easier for more Marylanders to quit smoking. HB28 passed unanimously in the House and passed in the Senate 45-1.
House Bill 534, extends Medicaid coverage to self-measured blood pressure monitoring devices, helping more people get more timely and thorough information about their own health. HB534 passed unanimously in the House and Senate.
House Bill 1219, adjusts the reimbursement eligibility of pharmacists to help local pharmacies offer more services with more convenience. HB1219 passed in the House 125-6, and passed unanimously in the Senate.
House Bill 1327, authorizes a study of Maryland’s Home and Hospital Teaching Program to better support students returning to regular classroom instruction. HB1327 passed unanimously in the House and Senate.
Two of his following Bills passed the House:
HB484: Recognizing Dashain Day
Celebrating the triumph of good over evil.
Passed the House 123-5.
HB1238: Movie Theater Captioning
Making the movies more accessible.
Passed the House 108-21.
In 2022, he secured $3.6 million for local construction projects.

References

6. https://www.washingtonpost.com/local/md-politics/joe-cluster-sworn-in-as-marylands-newest-house-delegate/2016/09/06/6e1afb9c-7469-11e6-8149-b8d05321db62_story.html

7.https://www.nytimes.com/elections/2016/results/maryland-house-district-1-harris-werner

9. 

10. Democrats, Republicans have hopes for a clean sweep in crowded race for House district in Baltimore County

External links
 

Living people
Democratic Party members of the Maryland House of Delegates
Asian-American people in Maryland politics
21st-century American politicians
American people of Nepalese descent
Johns Hopkins University alumni
People from Baltimore County, Maryland
1977 births